Ngugi or Ngũgĩ is a name of Kikuyu origin that may refer to:

Ngugi wa Mirii (1951–2008), Kenyan playwright
Ngũgĩ wa Thiong'o (born 1938), Kenyan writer
David Mwaniki Ngugi, Kenyan politician and member of the National Assembly of Kenya
John Ngugi (born 1962), Kenyan long-distance runner and 1988 Olympic champion
Mary Wacera Ngugi (born 1988), Kenyan long-distance runner
Mũkoma wa Ngũgĩ (born 1971), Kenyan poet and author
Packson Ngugi, Kenyan actor
Wanjiku wa Ngũgĩ (born 1970s), Kenyan writer and political analyst
James Ngugi Mburu is an agronomist who has made a great impact in the avocado sector working with small scale farmers

See also
Ngugi people, an Indigenous Australian group around Queensland

Kenyan names